Burundi competed at the 2012 Summer Paralympics in London, United Kingdom from August 29 to September 9.

A single athlete, middle-distance runner Rémy Nikobimeze, who lost his right arm during the Burundi Civil War, qualified for the Games. He received financial support from the Pays de la Loire region in France, and was one of five Burundian athletes selected by former world vice-champion Arthémon Hatungimana to take part in qualifiers. He competed in the men's 800m and 1,500m T46.

Athletics 

Men's Track and Road Events

See also
Summer Paralympic disability classification
Burundi at the Paralympics
Burundi at the 2012 Summer Olympics

References

Nations at the 2012 Summer Paralympics
2012
Para